Namma Ooru Raasa is a 1996 Indian Tamil-language drama film, directed by Ramarajan and produced by Nalini Ramarajan. The film stars Ramarajan, Sangita, Sathyapriya , Charle and Vadivelu.

Cast
Ramarajan as Raasa
Sangita as Rasaathi
Vadivelu as Nattamai
Charle
Ponnambalam as Kangeya
R. P. Viswam
Shanmugasundaram as Sathyamoorthy
Ponvannan as Kailash
Ganthimathi 
Sathyapriya
Halwa Vasu as Kanakku

Soundtrack
The music was composed by Sirpy.

References

1996 films
1990s Tamil-language films
Films directed by Ramarajan